The 2003–04 Austrian Cup was the 70th season of Austria's nationwide football cup competition. It commenced with the matches of the First Round in August 2003 and concluded with the Final on 23 May 2004. The competition was won by Grazer AK after beating Austria Vienna 5–4 on penalties after the match finished 3–3 after extra time Due to Grazer AK qualifying for European competition through winning the Bundesliga, Austria Vienna qualified for the 2004–05 UEFA Cup as cup runners-up.

First round

| colspan="3" style="background:#fcc;"|

|-
| colspan="3" style="background:#fcc;"|

|-
| colspan="3" style="background:#fcc;"|

|}

Second round

| colspan="3" style="background:#fcc;"|

|-
| colspan="3" style="background:#fcc;"|

|-
| colspan="3" style="background:#fcc;"|

|-
| colspan="3" style="background:#fcc;"|

|}

Third round

| colspan="3" style="background:#fcc;"|

|-
| colspan="3" style="background:#fcc;"|

|-
| colspan="3" style="background:#fcc;"|

|}

Quarter-finals

| colspan="3" style="background:#fcc;"|

|-
| colspan="3" style="background:#fcc;"|

|-
| colspan="3" style="background:#fcc;"|

|}

Semi-finals

| colspan="3" style="background:#fcc;"|

|-
| colspan="3" style="background:#fcc;"|

|}

Final

References

External links
 Austrian Cup 2003-2004
 RSSSF page

Austrian Cup seasons
2003–04 in Austrian football
Austrian Cup, 2003-04